KDE Connect is a multi-platform application developed by KDE, which facilitates wireless communications and data transfer between devices over local networks. KDE Connect is available in the repositories of many Linux Distributions and F-Droid, Google Play Store for Android. Often, distributions bundle KDE Connect in their KDE Plasma desktop variant. KDE Connect has been reimplemented in the GNOME desktop environment as GSConnect, which can be obtained from Gnome Extension Store.

Mechanism

KDE Connect utilizes various DBus interfaces from UI agnostic Libraries for a specific operating system for its functioning.

Features

 Shared clipboard: copy and paste between your phone and your computer (or any other device)
 Notification sync: Read and reply to your Android notifications from the desktop
 Share files and URLs instantly from one device to another including some file system integration
 Multimedia remote control: Use your phone as a remote for Linux media players
 Virtual touchpad: Use your phone screen as your computer's touchpad and keyboard
 Presentation remote: Advance your presentation slides straight from your phone

Encryption

KDE Connect uses Transport Layer Security (TLS) encryption protocol for communication. It uses SFTP to mount devices and to send files.

References

External links 

 

Free software programmed in C++
KDE Applications